deegree supplies the building blocks of a Spatial Data Infrastructure, while implementing the standards of the Open Geospatial Consortium (OGC) and ISO/TC 211. The Java-based deegree framework is the most extensive implementation of OGC/ISO standards in the field of Free Software.

The software graduated an OSGeo project as of January 4, 2012.

External links

OSGeo project page
Ohloh project overview

References 

Free GIS software
Free software programmed in Java (programming language)
Geographic information systems